Willy Peters (31 January 1915 – 13 August 1976) was a Swedish actor and director. He appeared in about 50 films. He was married to actress Agneta Lagerfeldt.

Selected filmography

 Ungdom av i dag (1935) - Nyblom
 Med folket för fosterlandet (1938) - Per Albin Hansson in 1909 (uncredited)
 Gubben kommer (1939) - Erik Hempelmann
 Oh, What a Boy! (1939) - Carl-Bertil Blomberg
 Mot nya tider (1939) - Per Albin Hansson
 Kronans käcka gossar (1940) - 45 Viktor Bengtsson
 Stål (1940) - Young man (uncredited)
 A Real Man (1940) - Nils (uncredited)
 Med dej i mina armar (1940) - Guest at Party (uncredited)
 Romans (1940) - Man
 Hans nåds testamente (1940) - Roger
 Bright Prospects (1941) - Borg
 Uppåt igen (1941) - Bengt Svensson Jr.
 Only a Woman (1941) - Andersson, accused (uncredited)
 The Talk of the Town (1941) - Friis, watchmaker
 Lasse-Maja (1941) - Alphonse
 Dangerous Ways (1942) - Policeman (uncredited)
 Tomorrow's Melody (1942) - 'Skjort-Lasse'
 Adventurer (1942) - Rönnow Bille
 It Is My Music (1942) - Birger, sculptor
 Halta Lottas krog (1942) - Kristian Hultcrantz
 Kvinnan tar befälet (1942) - Axel Bergström
 Ombyte av tåg (1943) - Rehearsing Actor (uncredited)
 Elvira Madigan (1943) - Officer (uncredited)
 A Girl for Me (1943) - Klas' Friend
 I dag gifter sig min man (1943) - Dentist Ström
 Life in the Country (1943) - Fritz
 Som folk är mest (1944) - Filip Blom, gemenligen kallad Fillebom
 Fattiga riddare (1944) - Gambler
 Maria of Kvarngarden (1945) - District Attorney
 Vad vet ni om Sussie (1945) - Oscar Lindberg
 I som här inträden... (1945) - Patient (uncredited)
 En förtjusande fröken (1945) - Henry
 13 stolar (1945) - Albert Bergman
 Försök inte med mej..! (1946) - Fritiof Floden
 Kristin Commands (1946) - Young Man (uncredited)
 No Way Back (1947) - Benito
 Each to His Own Way (1948) - Cetrén
 The Devil and the Smalander (1949) - Casimir
 Jungfrun på Jungfrusund (1949) - Boman
Åsa-Nisse Goes Hunting (1950) - Klöverhage
 Livat på luckan (1951) - 45 Viktor Bengtsson
 In Lilac Time (1952) - John Weijner
 Åsa-Nisse på nya äventyr (1952) - Klöverhage
 Åsa-Nisse on Holiday (1953) - Klöverhage
 Flottans glada gossar (1954) - Svensson, Lawyer (scenes deleted)
 Åsa-Nisse på hal is (1954) - Klöverhage, the district attorney
 Seger i mörker (1954) - Mr. Seaburg (uncredited)
 Brudar och bollar (1954) - Narrator
 Simon the Sinner (1954) - Journalist
 Flicka i kasern (1955) - Kjell
 Den vita stenen (1964)
 En sån strålande dag (1967) - Manager
 Shame (1968) - En äldre officer
 Skräcken har 1000 ögon (1970) - Gustaf, Police Officer
 Nana (1970) - The Prince
 Mannen från andra sidan (1972) - Board member

External links

1915 births
1976 deaths
Swedish male film actors
20th-century Swedish male actors